Garry Moss (born 5 July 1988) is an Australian rules football coach and former player who is the current coach of the Perth Football Club in the West Australian Football League. As a player he played with the Hawthorn Football Club in the Australian Football League.

Moss attended Newman College, graduating in 2005. He is the great nephew of the 1970 Brownlow Medallist, Peter Bedford. Drafted by Hawthorn with 56th overall pick in the 2006 AFL Draft from East Perth in the WAFL, he played as a midfielder and was on the Hawks' senior list for two seasons before being delisted, but then re-drafted at the end of the 2008 season.

After making his league debut in 2007, his 2008 season was wrecked by injuries, but he managed to play several games for Hawthorn's Victorian Football League (VFL) affiliate Box Hill Hawks.  He then played his second AFL game against the Sydney Swans in round 2 of the 2009 AFL season.  In Round 5 he was awarded the AFL Rising Star nomination following his four-goal and 24 possession performance against the West Coast Eagles.

In 2019 it was announced that Moss would succeed Earl Spalding as coach of the Perth Football Club from the 2021 WAFL season, following a season as assistant coach as part of a transition plan.

Statistics

|- style=background:#EAEAEA
| 2007 ||  || 37
| 1 || 0 || 0 || 8 || 2 || 10 || 6 || 1 || 0.0 || 0.0 || 8.0 || 2.0 || 10.0 || 6.0 || 1.0 || 0
|-
| 2008 ||  || 28
| 0 || — || — || — || — || — || — || — || — || — || — || — || — || — || — || 0
|- style=background:#EAEAEA
| 2009 ||  || 28
| 9 || 9 || 4 || 86 || 57 || 143 || 47 || 14 || 1.0 || 0.4 || 9.6 || 6.3 || 15.9 || 5.2 || 1.6 || 0
|-
| 2010 ||  || 28
| 4 || 3 || 2 || 35 || 21 || 56 || 19 || 5 || 0.8 || 0.5 || 8.8 || 5.3 || 14.0 || 4.8 || 1.3 || 0
|- class="sortbottom"
! colspan=3| Career
! 14 !! 12 !! 6 !! 129 !! 80 !! 209 !! 72 !! 20 !! 0.9 !! 0.4 !! 9.2 !! 5.7 !! 14.9 !! 5.1 !! 1.4 !! 0
|}

Honours and achievements
Individual
 AFL Rising Star nominee: 2009

References

External links

1988 births
Living people
Hawthorn Football Club players
Box Hill Football Club players
East Perth Football Club players
People educated at Newman College, Perth
Australian rules footballers from Perth, Western Australia
Perth Football Club coaches